Alex Ong Boon Hau (born 1951) is a Malaysian painter. Most of his paintings have naturalistic elements, and often depict plants from the wild, such as the yarrow.

Career
Born 1951 in Muar, Johor, Malaysia, Ong attended the Kuala Lumpur College of Art and graduated in 1977. Since then, he has held at least seven solo exhibitions, the first of which being in 1994. Ong has received two awards from the Malaysian Watercolour Society, one in 1987 and another in 1990, in recognition of his watercolour rock paintings. Ong's works have been cited as being able to "conjure up a romantic expression of life and love", such as the paintings in his 2008 exhibition titled Romance. His third solo exhibition, Seasons 2, which was held in 2002 as a follow-up to 1999's Seasons, reportedly took three years to complete. A member of the Singapore Watercolour Society, he visits New Zealand at least once every year to seek inspiration for his paintings.

References

Living people
1951 births
People from Johor
People from Muar
Malaysian painters